Laura Forgia, (born Laura Lena Forgia, 9 October 1982, in Angera), sometimes known as Lena Harva, is an Italian showgirl, model, actress and television presenter. She was born to an Italian father and Swedish mother.

Television

Filmography

Music videos

Others

References

External links

Laura Forgia at Mymovies.it 

Italian showgirls
Italian female models
21st-century Italian actresses
1982 births
Actors from Varese
Italian television presenters
Living people
Italian women television presenters
Italian people of Swedish descent